The 1971–72 Scottish Cup was the 87th staging of Scotland's most prestigious football knockout competition. The Cup was won by Celtic who defeated Hibernian in the final.

First round

Second round

Replays

Third round

Replays

Fourth round

Replays

Quarter-finals

Replays

Semi-finals

Replays

Final

Teams

References

See also
1971–72 in Scottish football
1971–72 Scottish League Cup

Scottish Cup seasons
1971–72 in Scottish football
Scot